Ralph Puckett Jr. (born December 8, 1926) is a retired United States Army officer. He led the Eighth Army Ranger Company during the Korean War and was awarded the Distinguished Service Cross for his actions on November 25, 1950, when his company of 51 Rangers was attacked by several hundred Chinese soldiers at the battle for Hill 205. He later served in the Vietnam War and retired from the army in 1971 as a colonel. After being appointed on July 19, 1996, he has served as the Honorary Colonel of the 75th Ranger Regiment.

In April 2021, Puckett's Distinguished Service Cross for his actions on November 25, 1950, was upgraded to the Medal of Honor. He received the award from President Joe Biden during a ceremony at the White House on May 21, 2021. He is the last surviving Medal of Honor recipient of the Korean War, since the death of Hiroshi Miyamura on November 29, 2022.

Early life
Puckett grew up in Tifton, Georgia, in South Georgia. He attended Tifton High School, then finished high school at Baylor School, at that time a military academy, in Chattanooga, Tennessee. He enrolled at Georgia Tech in 1943 before enlisting in the U.S. Army during World War II.

Military career
Puckett served in the Army Enlisted Reserve Corps from 1943 to 1945. In 1949, Puckett graduated from the United States Military Academy (where he captained the Army Boxing Team), was commissioned as an Infantry second lieutenant, deployed to Japan, and immediately volunteered to be assigned with the Rangers. When he was informed that there were no more lieutenant positions in the 8th Army Ranger Company, he said that he would "take a squad leader's or rifleman's job"; positions several grades lower than a lieutenant's. Colonel McGee, who was in charge of forming the company, was so impressed by Puckett's attitude that he gave him the company commander's position; a position normally reserved for captains. On 11 October 1950, the Eighth Army Ranger Company entered the Korean War, conducting raids during both daylight and night time conditions.

Hill 205

On November 25, 1950, Puckett and his company captured and held Hill 205, a strategic point overlooking the Chongchon River. Initially, they had to brace for attack from all sides, as the company of only 51 strong was over a mile from the nearest friendly unit and vulnerable to being completely surrounded. Earlier in the evening, Puckett had coordinated a series of increasingly more dangerous fire missions with the artillery, in order for the Rangers to have artillery support to rapidly adjust to new attacks.

At 10pm, the Chinese began their attack by firing a mortar salvo against Puckett and his Rangers. Six waves of Chinese forces assaulted the hill for the next four and a half hours. Several times, Puckett was forced to call in artillery fire "danger close", placing the Rangers within the danger radius of the friendly artillery. During the course of the battle, he was wounded several times, once by grenade fragments and then twice more when two mortars landed in his fox hole. After his wounds rendered him barely conscious, Puckett ordered his Rangers to leave him behind and abandon the position. Two of Puckett's Rangers, Privates First Class David L. Pollock and Billy G. Walls, ignored his orders and initially carried him and subsequently dragged him down the hill as they received ineffective small arms fire. Puckett was medically evacuated from the hill and would be hospitalized for a year due to the wounds he suffered that night.

After Korea
Following the Korean War, Puckett served over two years in the U.S. Army Infantry School Ranger Department as commander of the Mountain Ranger Division. As the first Ranger Advisor in the U.S. Army Mission to Colombia, he planned and established the Colombian Army Escuela de Lanceros (Ranger School). Later, he commanded "B" and "C" teams in the 10th Special Forces Group in Germany. In 1967, Puckett, then a Lieutenant Colonel, commanded the 2d Battalion, 502d Infantry (Airborne) of the 101st Airborne Division in Vietnam. He was awarded a second Distinguished Service Cross for heroic leadership in August 1967.

Medal of Honor citation

Retirement

Colonel Puckett retired in 1971 after 22 years of active duty to become the national programs coordinator of Outward Bound, Inc. He subsequently established leadership and teamwork development program Discovery, Inc. After several years of successful leadership at Discovery, Inc. in Herndon, Virginia, Puckett moved to Atlanta and began the Discovery Program at The Westminster Schools. In 1984, he became the executive vice president of MicroBilt, Inc., a soft- and hardware computer company.  Puckett was an inaugural inductee into the U.S. Army Ranger Hall of Fame in 1992. He served as the Honorary Colonel for the 75th Ranger Regiment from 1996 to 2006 for which he was awarded the Distinguished Civilian Service Award. He speaks often at graduations and other functions at Fort Benning and is an Honorary Instructor at The Infantry School. He was inducted into the Order of St. Maurice in 1998, and was the 1998 Ranger of the Year for the Ranger Infantry Companies of the Korean War. He was inducted into the USAF Gathering of Eagles in 1999. He was added to the Tifton, Georgia, Wall of Fame in 2004. Other honors include appointment as an Ambassador of Goodwill by the Western Hemisphere Institute for Security Cooperation, selection as a Distinguished Graduate of the United States Military Academy in 2004, and selection as the Infantry's Doughboy Award recipient in 2007. He is the author of Words for Warriors: A Professional Soldier's Notebook and numerous media articles.

Awards and decorations

Other awards
Order of Saint Maurice (Primicerius)

Puckett also earned 3 Overseas Service Bars, the 101st Airborne Division Combat Service Identification Badge, the Eighth Army Shoulder sleeve insignia, the Army Staff Identification Badge and the 75th Ranger Regiment Distinctive unit insignia.

Legacy
Colonel Ralph Puckett Parkway, a stretch of First Division and Dixie roads running from the end of I-185 to Sightseeing Road on Fort Benning, was dedicated on 8 June 2012.
Colonel Puckett is the namesake of the Colonel Ralph Puckett Leadership Award series.
The first award is a competition to identify a junior officer in the Ranger Regiment who sticks out amongst his peers for his take-charge attitude. The contest extends over three days and nights and consists of several different physical fitness tests, weapons firing, military skills, essay preparation, and appearance before a board of officers and senior non-commissioned officers. The winner of the award is considered by the Regiment as the entry in the Army-wide MacArthur Award competition.
The second award is presented to the Officer Honor Graduate at the U.S. Army Ranger Course. The recipient of this award performs successfully in each leadership position, completes the demanding Ranger Course without repeating any phase, and was acclaimed by his peers.
The third award is presented to an officer in the Maneuver Captains Career Course who displayed exceptional leadership and exhibits exemplary physical condition, consistent high academic standing, and served in a leadership position.

References

1926 births
Living people
United States Army Rangers
United States Army colonels
United States Military Academy alumni
United States Army Medal of Honor recipients
Korean War recipients of the Medal of Honor
Recipients of the Distinguished Service Cross (United States)
Recipients of the Silver Star
Recipients of the Legion of Merit
Recipients of the Air Medal
Recipients of the Order of Saint Maurice
People from Columbus, Georgia
People from Tifton, Georgia
Military personnel from Georgia (U.S. state)
United States Army personnel of the Korean War
United States Army reservists
Recipients of the Gallantry Cross (Vietnam)